Alain Jomy (born 23 April 1941 in Nice) is a French film music composer, music critic, film critic, director, and writer. He trained at the École Normale de Musique de Paris where he was taught by Hélène Boschi.

Filmography 
 1972: La Soirée du baron Swenbeck, by Hubert Niogret (short film)
 1974: Nouvelles de Henry James, by Luc Béraud (TV series) (episode Ce qui savait Morgan)
 1976: The Best Way to Walk, by Claude Miller
 1977: This Sweet Sickness, by Claude Miller
 1980: L'Embrumé, by Josée Dayan (TV)
 1980: Haine, by Dominique Goult
 1980: La Petite sirène, by Roger Andrieux
 1980: Anthracite, by Édouard Niermans
 1981: Instinct de femme, by Claude Othnin-Girard
 1981: Les Filles de Grenoble, by Joël Le Moigné
 1984: O Lugar do Morto, by António-Pedro Vasconcelos
 1985: L'Art d'aimer, by Dominique Cabrera
 1985: An Impudent Girl, by Claude Miller
 1988: The Little Thief, by Claude Miller
 1991: Flora de Dresde, by Alain Jomy (short film)
 1992: Le Lieutenant Lorena (Aqui D'El Rei!), by António-Pedro Vasconcelos (TV)
 1992: Un ballon dans la tête, by Michaëla Watteaux (TV)
 1992: The Accompanist, by Claude Miller
 1992: Les Eaux dormantes, by Jacques Tréfouel
 1993: Une image de trop, by Jean-Claude Missiaen (TV)
 1995: Été brulant, by Jérôme Foulon (TV)
 1996: L'Île aux secrets, by Bruno Herbulot (TV)
 1997: Oranges amères, by Michel Such
 1997: Le Garçon d'orage, by Jérôme Foulon (TV)
 1998: Un taxi dans la nuit, by Alain-Michel Blanc (TV)
 1998: Il n'y a pas d'amour sans histoires by Jérôme Foulon
 1999: Jaime, by António-Pedro Vasconcelos
 2001: Un cœur oublié, by Philippe Monnier (TV)
 2001: Une femme amoureuse, by Jérôme Foulon (TV)
 2004: Une autre vie by Luc Béraud
 2005: La storia di B. by Alexandre Messina
 2009: Les Marais criminels by Alexandre Messina

Theatre 
 1981: Music for La Môme vert-de-gris staged by Jean-Pierre Bastid after Poison Ivy by Peter Cheyney

Awards 
 Diapason d'Or 2008 for the DVD of the documentary film (1h 30) directed by Alain Jomy: Pablo Casals. Un musicien dans le monde.

Publications 
 Heureux comme à Monterey, Calmann-Lévy, 2000
 Le livre d'Elena, Ramsay, 2007
 Olga et les siens, Alma Editeur, on Babeblio 2018,

References

External links 
 
 Interview Alain Jomy sur Cinezik.org
 Alain Jomy (Discogs)

1941 births
Living people
People from Nice
École Normale de Musique de Paris alumni
French film score composers
French film directors
French film critics
21st-century French novelists
French male musicians
French male film score composers